"This Is Gospel" is a song by American rock band Panic! at the Disco. It was released as the second single from their fourth studio album, Too Weird to Live, Too Rare to Die!, on August 12, 2013. A music video for the song, directed by Daniel Cloud Campos, was also released on the same day. It peaked at number 87 on the Billboard Hot 100 singles chart.

Music video

The music video for "This Is Gospel" was released on August 12, 2013, coinciding with the song's single release, through Fueled by Ramen's YouTube channel. It was directed by Daniel "Cloud" Campos. As of October 2021,the video has over 211 million views on YouTube.

The video features Brendon at the moment when surgeons check his injuries. As they almost start to open his body, he removes the air mask and begins to fight, but tortured. A few seconds later, he is tricked by people and dressed up nicely; however, he is buried alive (with water) and tries to swim in the endless water and break a cardboard wall. Eventually, the scene returns to the surgery, and the surgeons discover that rope is in his body; they used it but he runs away, but pays a life due to suffocation and losing breath from the ropes on his throat. The music video for the band's song "Emperor's New Clothes" is a direct continuation of this video, just as the music video for the band's song "Say Amen (Saturday Night)" is the prequel to this video.

The Music video to the Piano version consists of Urie sitting at a piano in an empty lot and performing the song while streamers, confetti, and ribbons are dropped on him and the piano. Eventually large amounts of water balloons, milk, eggs, noodles, pickles, chicken, and various other discarded foods are dropped onto the piano. As Urie walks away at the end of the song, buckets of blue and purple water are dumped on him. The video was uploaded to Fueled by Ramen's YouTube channel on May 14, 2014.

Charts

Weekly charts

Year-end charts

Certifications

Release history

References

Panic! at the Disco songs
2013 singles
2013 songs
Songs written by Brendon Urie
Songs written by Dallon Weekes
Songs written by Jake Sinclair (musician)
Song recordings produced by Butch Walker
Fueled by Ramen singles